Cold as Ice is the debut album by rapper Charli Baltimore, released promotionally on August 3, 1999 through Epic Records. It was originally titled "To Hell & Back", with a release date of April 28, 1999.  The album did not make it to any Billboard charts since it did not see a public release, but the single "Stand Up" reached #9 on the Hot Rap Singles. Guests on the album include Ghostface Killah, Da Brat, Lady of Rage, Gangsta Boo, Mobb Deep, Cam'ron, N.O.R.E., and producer DJ Premier. Baltimore also recorded a collaboration with former friend Mase titled "Ice," but the song's prominent sample of "Under Pressure" by Queen and David Bowie could not be cleared.  The album has now been released as a digital download on iTunes, with "Money" being a separate download from the Woo Soundtrack.

Track listing

Unreleased material 
In 2002, it was revealed that producer Irv Gotti had produced two tracks for the album in 1998 but never made the final cut of the album.

"Ice" featuring Mase (produced by Tumblin' Dice) was not included, as sample clearance could not be obtained for the samples of Queen and David Bowie's 1981 song "Under Pressure".

References 

1999 debut albums
Albums produced by RZA
Albums produced by DJ Premier
Albums produced by Teddy Riley
Epic Records albums